IFET college of Engineering is an Autonomous college of Engineering, Technology  and Management located in Valavanur, Villupuram, Tamil Nadu, India known for its predominant ranking by the university and placements in the rural region of Tamil Nadu. It was established in 1998 by the Indo French Educational Trust. It is an ISO 9000:2008 certified institution and is permanently affiliated to Anna University, Chennai and approved by All India Council for Technical Education, New Delhi. It was accredited by National Board of Accreditation and awarded B grade by National Assessment and Accreditation Council.

External links
 

Engineering colleges in Tamil Nadu
Colleges affiliated to Anna University
Education in Viluppuram district
Educational institutions established in 1998
1998 establishments in Tamil Nadu